Acharya Aatreya (born Kilambi Venkata Narasimhacharyulu ) (7 May 1921 – 13 September 1989) was an Indian poet, lyricist, playwright, and screenwriter known for his works in Telugu cinema and Telugu theatre. He received the state Nandi Award for Best Lyricist in 1981 for "Andamaina Lokamani" from the film Tholikoodi Koosindi. He is popularly known as Manasu Kavi.

Life
Athreya was born on 7 May 1921 in Mangalampadu village near Sullurpeta, Nellore district of the Madras Presidency of British India. His birthname was Kilambi Venkata Narasimhacharyulu. He took Acharya from his birth name and Aatreya his Gotra name, combined them as Acharya Aatreya and adopted it as his pen name.

As a student in Nellore and Chittoor he wrote several plays. He abandoned his studies to participate in Quit India Movement and was jailed. After releasing from jail, he had worked as a clerk in a settlement office and worked as an assistant editor of the journal Zamin Raithu which is based out of Nellore.

Athreya married Padmavathi in 1940.

Career 
Athreya continued his pursuit for social reform, transformation and universal peace, with his 10 Natakams [plays] and 15 Natikas, which include Bhayam ( Fear), Viswa Shanti ( Universal Peace), Kappalu ( Frogs), Goutama Buddha, Ashoka Samrat, Parivartanam, Edureeta and Tirupati. He was awarded an Honorary Doctorate Degree by Dr. B.R. Ambedkar Open University of Hyderabad, for his contributions to Telugu literature.

Athreya made his film debut in 1951. He went on to write over 1400 film songs. In 1989, he published a compilation of his works titled Naa Paata Nee Nota Palakali ( You would sing my song).''

Death 
Athreya died on 13 September 1989.

Partial filmography

References

External links
 

1921 births
1989 deaths
Telugu screenwriters
Nandi Award winners
Indian lyricists
Telugu-language lyricists
Telugu people
Telugu-language writers
Andhra University alumni
Indian male dramatists and playwrights
20th-century Indian dramatists and playwrights
Telugu-language dramatists and playwrights
People from Nellore district
20th-century Indian poets
Poets from Andhra Pradesh
Indian male poets
Screenwriters from Andhra Pradesh
20th-century Indian male writers
20th-century Indian screenwriters